"Sex & Drugs & Rock & Roll" is a 1977 single by Ian Dury, who popularised the phrase.

Sex and drugs and rock and roll may refer to:

Music
 Sex, Drugs & Rock 'n' Roll, a 1989 album by American heavy metal band the Mentors
 "Sex Drugs & Rock-n-Roll", a song by American glam metal Faster Pussycat on their 2006 The Power and the Glory Hole
 "Sex & Drugs & Rock and Roll", a song by American heavy metal band Texas Hippie Coalition on their 2012 album Peacemaker
 "Sex, Drugs, Rock 'n' Roll", a 2021 single by American avant-pop musician Will Wood.

Other
 Sex & Drugs & Rock & Roll (film), a 2010 biographical film about Ian Dury by Mat Whitecross
 Sex and Drugs and Rock and Roll: The Life of Ian Dury, a biography of Ian Dury
 Sex, Drugs, Rock & Roll (stage show), a one-man stage show by Eric Bogosian
 Sex, Drugs, Rock & Roll (film), a 1991 film of the Eric Bogosian stage show
 Sex, Drugs, Rock 'N' Roll & the End of the World, a 1982 American comedy album
 Sex & Drugs & Rock & Roll (TV series), a 2015 American comedy television series created by and starring Denis Leary

See also 
 Wine, women and song, the root phrase
 A Tale of Sex, Designer Drugs, and the Death of Rock N Roll, a 1998 EP by American rock band Pretty Boy Floyd
 Sex and drugs